Martin Hardin may refer to:

 Martin D. Hardin (1780-1823), United States Senator from Kentucky
 Martin Davis Hardin (1837–1923), Brigadier General in the Union Army during the American Civil War; Grandson of the U.S. Senator